Blue Stompin'  is an album by the saxophonist Hal Singer with trumpeter Charlie Shavers that was recorded in 1959 for the Prestige label.

Reception

The AllMusic review by Scott Yanow stated: "This is a fun set of heated swing with early R&B overtones ... there are many fine moments on this enjoyable set. Recommended".

Track listing 
All compositions by Hal Singer and Eli Robinson, except where indicated.
 "Blue Stompin'" – 6:28
 "Windy" (Charlie Shavers) – 6:52
 "With a Song in My Heart" (Richard Rodgers, Lorenz Hart) – 5:03
 "Midnight" – 11:05
 "Fancy Pants" (Shavers) – 4:32
 "The Blast Off" – 4:36

Personnel 
 Hal Singer – tenor saxophone
 Charlie Shavers – trumpet
 Ray Bryant – piano
 Wendell Marshall - bass
 Osie Johnson - drums

References 

1959 albums
Hal Singer albums
Charlie Shavers albums
Albums produced by Esmond Edwards
Albums recorded at Van Gelder Studio
Prestige Records albums